KN or kn may refer to:

Companies
 Kia (2021 logo often misread as KN), a South Korean multinational automobile manufacturer
 Kieler Nachrichten, the only German-language newspaper published in Kiel, Germany
 Kuehne + Nagel, a global transport and logistics company
 K&N Engineering, manufacturer of car parts and consumables

Language
 Kannada (ISO 639-1 code), a Dravidian language
 , the Latin-script digraph used in English to write the word-initial sound

Science
 Complete graph, a simple undirected graph in which every pair of distinct vertices is connected by a unique edge
 Kilonewton (kN), a common expression of forces measured in newtons (N)
 Knot (unit), a unit of speed equal to one nautical mile per hour
 Knudsen number (Kn), a dimensionless number

Other uses
 .kn, the Internet country code top-level domain for Saint Kitts and Nevis
 Croatian kuna (kn), the currency of Croatia from 30 May 1994 until 31 December 2022
 Saint Kitts and Nevis (ISO 3166 code), an island country and microstate